Arsonval is a commune in the Aube department in north-central France.

It has a church dating from the twelfth century.

Population

Personalities
 Victor-Eugène Ardouin-Dumazet (born in 1852, died in 1940 at Arsonval) : journalist, author of "Voyage en France", tourist guides (in 60 volumes).

See also
Communes of the Aube department

References

Attribution:

Communes of Aube